Girija Vyas (born 8 July 1946) is an Indian politician, poet and author. She was a Member of the 15th Lok Sabha, the lower house of the Parliament of India, from the Chittorgarh constituency and former president of National Commission for Women of India.

Personal life
Girija Vyas was born on 8 July 1946 to Krishna Sharma and  Jamuna Devi Vyas.

After obtaining a Doctorate in Philosophy, she taught at Mohanlal Sukhadia University of Udaipur and the University of Delaware.

She has written eight books, three of which contain her poetry. Ehsaas Ke Par has her Urdu poems, Seep, Samundar Aur Moti has both her Hindi and Urdu poems while Nostalgia is enriched with English verses.

Political career
In 1985, as a candidate of the Indian National Congress party, she was elected as a Member of the Legislative Assembly from Udaipur, Rajasthan and served as a Minister in the Government of Rajasthan till 1990.

In 1991, she was elected to the Indian Parliament, representing Udaipur, Rajasthan in the Lok Sabha and was appointed a Deputy Minister (Information and Broadcasting) in the Federal Government of India in the Narsimha Rao ministry.

1993 onwards: President, All India Mahila Congress;
1993-96: Member, Consultative Committee, Ministry of Petroleum and Natural Gas; Member, Standing Committee on House and External Affairs
1996: Re-elected to 11th Lok Sabha (2nd term)
1996 onwards: Member, Committee on Raj Bhasha; Member, Committee on Empowerment of Women; Member, Standing Committee on Petroleum; Member, Consultative Committee, Ministry of Home Affairs
1999: Re-elected to 13th Lok Sabha (3rd term)
1999-2000: Member, Committee on Petroleum and Chemicals

From 2001 to 2004, she was also the President, Rajasthan Provincial Congress Committee.  Currently, she is chairperson, Media Department, All India Congress Committee and member, Indo-EU Civil Society.

In February 2005, the Congress Party dominated U.P.A. Government of Manmohan Singh, nominated her to the position of the Chairperson of the Fifth National Commission for Women, a Constitutional & Statutory body, a position she was holding till 01/08/2011.

She was also elected as M.L.A. in Rajasthan in 2008.

She was the Minister of Housing and Urban Poverty Alleviation in 2013.

References

1946 births
Living people
Rajasthani people
20th-century Indian women writers
Mohanlal Sukhadia University alumni
University of Delaware faculty
People from Udaipur
India MPs 2009–2014
India MPs 1999–2004
India MPs 1996–1997
India MPs 1991–1996
Lok Sabha members from Rajasthan
Politicians from Udaipur
20th-century Indian poets
Poets from Rajasthan
Women writers from Rajasthan
Women state cabinet ministers of India
Women members of the Cabinet of India
State cabinet ministers of Rajasthan
Rajasthan MLAs 1985–1990
Rajasthan MLAs 2008–2013
Women members of the Rajasthan Legislative Assembly
Women members of the Lok Sabha
21st-century Indian women politicians
21st-century Indian politicians
20th-century Indian women politicians
20th-century Indian politicians